Cedelizumab is a monoclonal antibody acting on the immune system. Possible indications include the prevention of organ transplant rejections and the treatment of autoimmune diseases.

It has been approved by both the U.S. Food and Drug Administration and the European Medicines Agency for the treatment of patients with moderate-to-severe Crohn's disease (CD) and ulcerative colitis (UC).

Vedolizumab is a humanized monoclonal antibody, which binds to integrin α4β7 (LPAM-1, lymphocyte Peyer's patch adhesion molecule 1, a dimer of Integrin alpha-4 and Integrin beta-7) on T lymphocytes to interfere with lymphocyte trafficking to the gut.

References

Monoclonal antibodies